Francis J. “Hun” Ryan (January 10, 1908 in Philadelphia, Pennsylvania – October 14, 1977 in Philadelphia, Pennsylvania) was an American soccer midfielder.  He earned three caps, scoring one goal, with the U.S. national team between 1928 and 1936.  He was also a member of the U.S.  teams at the 1928 Summer Olympics, 1936 Summer Olympics, and the 1934 FIFA World Cup.  Ryan was inducted into the National Soccer Hall of Fame in 1958.

Playing career
Ryan grew up in Philadelphia, Pennsylvania where he played soccer with Frankford High School.  He also played for the Lighthouse Boys Club team.  He maintained his amateur status which led to his selection to the national team at the 1928 Summer Olympics.  In 1929, he signed with New York Galicia.  After one season, he moved back to Lighthouse Boys Club.  Once again, he spent only one season with Lighthouse before moving to the Philadelphia German-Americans in 1931.  He continued with the team until at least 1936.  In 1933, Philadelphia joined the American Soccer League (ASL).  The German-Americans won the 1934-1935 ASL championship and the 1936 National Challenge Cup. Ryan served with the Custer Division in the U.S. Army from 1942 to 1945. Upon is return to Philadelphia, he played with the Philadelphia Nationals, leading the team to the ASL Lewis Cup in 1948-49 and 1951–52. Ryan also played with the Pennsylvania All Stars in May 1931 against Glasgow Celtic during the Scottish team's first North American tour.

National team
Ryan earned his first cap on May 28, 1928, in 11–2 loss to Argentina at the 1928 Summer Olympics.  Scored ten days later in a 3–3 tie with Poland in Warsaw.  He did not play for the U.S. again until the 1934 FIFA World Cup when he was part of the 7–1 loss to Italy.  He finished out his national team career at the 1936 Summer Olympics.

In 1958, Ryan was inducted into the National Soccer Hall of Fame.

References

External links
 Soccer Hall of Fame bio

1908 births
1977 deaths
United States men's international soccer players
Olympic soccer players of the United States
Footballers at the 1928 Summer Olympics
Footballers at the 1936 Summer Olympics
1934 FIFA World Cup players
Lighthouse Boys Club players
American Soccer League (1933–1983) players
Uhrik Truckers players
National Soccer Hall of Fame members
Soccer players from Philadelphia
American soccer players
Association football forwards
Association football midfielders